Brood is the second studio album by Melbourne band My Friend the Chocolate Cake. The album was released in July 1994 and peaked at number 32 on the ARIA Chart.

At the ARIA Music Awards of 1995, the album won the ARIA Award for Best Adult Contemporary Album.

Track listing 
(All lyrics by David Bridie except where noted; all arrangements by My Friend the Chocolate Cake)
 "Dance (You Stupid Monster to my Soft Song)" – 2:36
 "I've Got a Plan" – 3:12
 "Throwing It Away" – 3:59
 "Greenkeeping" – 3:27
 "The Old Years" – 3:46
 "Song From Under the Floorboards" (music, lyrics by Howard Devoto) – 3:57
 "Jimmy Stynes" – 3:21
 "Slow Way to Go Down" – 5:18
 "Bottom and the Rustics" – 4:23
 "Rosetta" – 3:49
 "The Gossip" – 4:18
 "Brood" – 3:47
 "Yandoit" – 4:17
 "The Pramsitters" – 3:12
 "Aberystwyth" – 4:10
 "The Red Wallpaper" – 1:40
 "John Cain Avenue" – 3:43
 "Low" – 2:28

Personnel 
 David Bridie - vocals, piano, harmonium
 Helen Mountfort - cello, backing vocals
 Hope Csutoros - violin, occasional viola and hats
 Andrew Carswell - mandolin, tin whistle, mandola
 Andrew Richardson - acoustic guitar
 Michael Barker - drums, percussion
 Bill McDonald - bass guitar ("Plan", "Old Years", "Song From Under the Floorboards")
 Jim Rondinelli - backing vocals ("The Old Years")

Chart

References 

My Friend the Chocolate Cake albums
1994 albums
ARIA Award-winning albums